Samma skrot och korn is a studio album by Gyllene Tider, released on 14 June 2019.

Track listing
All songs written and composed by Per Gessle, except "Någon att hålla i hand", which was written and composed by Allan Forss, Thomas Connor and Charles Thomas.

Skrot och korn
Det känns inte som maj
Jag drömde jag mötte fluortanten
Någon att hålla i hand
Vid hennes sida
Aftonstjärna
Vanliga saker
Bjud till
Låt denna trumslagarpojke sjunga
Mannen med gitarr
Bara i en dröm
Henry har en plan på gång
Allt det andra
Final

Chart positions

References

External links

2019 albums
Gyllene Tider albums